Emiliano Bolongaita is a Distinguished Service Professor of Public Policy and Management at Carnegie Mellon University and the Head of Carnegie Mellon University Australia.

Career 
Prior to his appointment in 2013, Bolongaita held various senior roles in international development positions in the Asia-Pacific region. He was the Unit Head of the Central Asia Regional Economic Cooperation Program (CAREC) of the Asian Development Bank and, previous to this role, a Public Management Specialist in the Bank's South Asia Department. In his academic career, Bolongaita has taught at the Elliott School for International Studies at George Washington University, the National University of Singapore and the Asian Institute of Management. He has written various academic papers on corruption and is co-editor and contributor of Challenging Corruption in Asia: Case Studies and a Framework for Action published by the World Bank in 2004.

Education 
Bolongaita received his PhD in Government and International Studies and Masters in International Peace Studies from the University of Notre Dame, Indiana, USA. He graduated with a Bachelor of Arts degree in Philosophy from the Ateneo de Mania University in the Philippines.

References 

Carnegie Mellon University faculty
Living people
Date of birth missing (living people)
Year of birth missing (living people)